The Canadian Screen Award for Best Achievement in Sound Editing is awarded by the Academy of Canadian Cinema and Television to the best sound editor on a Canadian film. The award was first presented in 1970 as part of the Canadian Film Awards, before being transitioned to the new Genie Awards in 1980; since 2013 it has been presented as part of the Canadian Screen Awards.

1970s

1980s

1990s

2000s

2010s

2020s

See also
Prix Iris for Best Sound

References

 
Sound editing
Film sound awards